Antonio Maino (born 23 November 1951) is an Italian masters athlete who won two medals at the European Masters Games.

Achievements

See also
 List of Italian records in masters athletics

References

External links 
 Antonio Maino at FIDAL 

1951 births
Living people
Italian masters athletes